× Colmanara, abbreviated Colm. in the horticultural trade, is the nothogenus comprising intergeneric hybrids between the orchid genera Miltonia, Odontoglossum and Oncidium (Milt. × Odm. × Onc.).

The name refers to Jeremiah Colman (1859–1942), an English collector of orchids, and uses the suffix -ara used to form nothogenera of orchids. The nothogenus was established in 1936.

In the current botanical classifications according to Genera Orchidacearum by Alec M. Pridgeon, Phillip J. Cribb, Mark W. Chase, and Finn N. Rasmussen, Odontoglossum is merged into Oncidium and × Colmanara is considered to be the same as the nothogenus × Miltonidium. The RHS Orchid register does not register × Colmanara anymore.

References

Orchid nothogenera
Oncidiinae
Historically recognized angiosperm taxa